Robat (also Romanized as Robāţ; also known as Aḩmadābād) is a village in Harirud Rural District, Bujgan District, Torbat-e Jam County, Razavi Khorasan Province, Iran. At the 2006 census, its population was 585, in 124 families.

References 

Populated places in Torbat-e Jam County